The  is a Japanese theatre company located in Shibuya, Tokyo. It was founded on December 17, 1954 and stages Shingeki plays. Many of its actors have gone on to become voice actors for anime productions.

Notable members
Male
Masuo Amada
Katsumi Chō
Nobuaki Fukuda
Takaya Hashi
Shūichirō Idemitsu
Akira Igarashi
Kenjirō Ishimaru
Shirō Ishimoda
Hiroshi Iwasaki
Ryō Kamon
Ippei Kanie
Kenichi Katō
Takuya Kirimoto
Masahiro Kobayashi
Kenji Kodama
Shōji Ōki
Masaru Shinodzuka
Hideaki Tezuka
Masane Tsukayama
Takumi Tsutsui
Kihachirō Uemura
Kazuhiro Yamaji
Ryūji Yamamoto
Fubito Yamano
Hiroshi Yanaka
Etsuo Yokobori
Makoto Yuasa

Female
Emiko Azuma
Kayoko Fujii
Ryōko Gi
Narumi Hidaka
Miwa Ikezaki
Yoshimi Iwasaki
Akiko Izumi
Tomie Kataoka
Kazuko Katō
Sayaka Kobayashi
Yōko Koyanagi
Shizue Masuko
Kaori Matsunaga
Tomoko Miyadera
Yōko Motai
Non Nonomura
Yukari Nozawa
Atsuko Takahata
Futami Uesugi

Former members
Jūkei Fujioka (deceased)
Kōe Hatsui (deceased)
Tomoyuki Dan (deceased)
Manabu Ino
Daisuke Koshikawa
Gin Moritsuka (deceased)
Mosahiko Naruse
Toshiyuki Nishida
Naoto Ogata
Sumi Shimamoto
Kōsuke Suzuki
Naoto Takenaka
Hideyuki Tanaka
Hisano Yamaoka (deceased)
Yō Yoshimura (deceased)

External links
Seinenza Theater Company

Japanese voice actor management companies
Mass media in Tokyo